Taxidermy is the sixth album by Abney Park, with Gothic rock and industrial dance Influences. The album is a collection of new versions of songs from past albums, some live tracks, and two covers.

Track listing
"The Wake (2005 Mix)"
"New Black Day"
"The Change Cage (2005 Mix)"
"White Wedding" (Billy Idol cover)
"The Root Of All Evil - Live"
"The Shadow Of Life - Live"
"The Only One - Live"
"Creep" (Radiohead cover)
"Dead Silence (2005 Mix)"
"The Wake (Dream Mix)"

Credits
 Robert Brown - Vocals
 Kristina Erickson - Keyboards
 Traci Nemeth - Vocals
 Rob Hazelton - Guitar and vocals
 Krysztof Nemeth - Bass
 Thomas Thompson - Bass (New Black Day and White Wedding)
 Rachel Gilley - Vocals (New Black Day, White Wedding and Dead Silence)
 Henry Cheng - Guitar (Creep)

References 

Abney Park (band) albums
2005 albums